Yassine Hethat (born 30 July 1991) is an Algerian middle-distance runner. He competed in the 1500 metres at the 2015 World Championships in Beijing.

He qualified to the 2016 Summer Olympics in Rio de Janeiro. He reached the semi-finals in the 800m with a personal best of 1:44.81 without being able to make it to the final alongside the other Algerian Taoufik Makhloufi.

In 2021, he qualified again for the 2020 Summer Olympics after running a new personal best of 1:44.25 in Castellón (Spain) on 29 June 2021.

International competitions

Personal bests
Outdoor
800 metres –1:44.06 (Strasbourg 2022)
1000 metres – 2:16.59 (Székesfehérvár 2018)
1500 metres – 3:35.68 (Oordegem-Lede 2014)

Indoor
800 metres – 1:46.83 (Algiers, 1 February 2022)

References

External links

1991 births
Living people
Algerian male middle-distance runners
World Athletics Championships athletes for Algeria
Athletes (track and field) at the 2015 African Games
Place of birth missing (living people)
Athletes (track and field) at the 2016 Summer Olympics
Olympic athletes of Algeria
Athletes (track and field) at the 2018 Mediterranean Games
Athletes (track and field) at the 2022 Mediterranean Games
African Games competitors for Algeria
Mediterranean Games competitors for Algeria
Athletes (track and field) at the 2020 Summer Olympics
21st-century Algerian people
Mediterranean Games silver medalists for Algeria
Mediterranean Games medalists in athletics